Mark Chesnutt is an American country music singer. His discography comprises eighteen studio albums, five compilation albums, and 48 singles. Although Chesnutt's first release was Doing My Country Thing in 1988 on Axbar Records, he did not break through until his second album, 1990's Too Cold at Home, on MCA Nashville. This album and the two that followed — Longnecks & Short Stories and Almost Goodbye, from 1992 and 1993, respectively — are all certified platinum by the RIAA, as is his 1996 Greatest Hits. 1994's What a Way to Live, the first of four albums that he released on Decca Records, is certified gold.

Chesnutt's first chart entry is "Too Cold at Home" from 1990, a #3 hit on the U.S. country singles charts. After this song came his first Number One, "Brother Jukebox", followed by a string of chart singles that lasted throughout the 1990s; they include the Number Ones "I'll Think of Something", "It Sure Is Monday", "Almost Goodbye", "I Just Wanted You to Know", "Gonna Get a Life", "It's a Little Too Late", and a cover of Aerosmith's "I Don't Want to Miss a Thing". This cover is also his only Top 40 pop hit, reaching #17 on the Billboard Hot 100. He has sold more than ten million records worldwide.

Studio albums

1980s

1990s

2000s

2010s

Compilation albums

Live albums

EP's

Singles

1990-2000

A"I Don't Want to Miss a Thing" peaked at number 17 on the Billboard Hot 100.

2001-present

Featured singles

Other charted songs

Videography

Music videos

Guest appearances

References

Country music discographies
Discographies of American artists